This timeline of piracy in the 1990s is a chronological list of key events involving pirates between 1990 and 1999.

Events

1995
September 13 - The freighter Anna Sierra is boarded off the coast of Thailand after a group numbering 23 men overtook the ship in a motorboat. Heavily armed, the crew were forced to surrender and eventually set adrift in the ship's lifeboats. The pirates set sail for China and, repainting and refitting the ship within two days, arrived in Beihai where they used forged papers to sell the ship's cargo of sugar. The ship was eventually located following the crew's rescue and, after a legal battle between the ship's owners, the ship was beached at Beihai. The pirates, although held in Chinese custody, were not charged by authorities.

1996
The London-based International Maritime Bureau reports approximately 224 acts of piracy. 
Several hours after leaving Singapore, the tanker Succi is attacked and boarded by several armed men and, setting the crew adrift in a lifeboat, successfully made their escape. Although the crew were later rescued, the tanker has not been recovered. 
Intersall, Inc., discovers an 18th-century shipwreck near Beaufort, North Carolina, believed to be Blackbeard's flagship, Queen Anne's Revenge.
Summer - A British couple are attacked by pirates, armed with assault rifles and grenades, while sailing around the Greek island of Corfu.

1998
 The London-based International Maritime Bureau reported worldwide acts of piracy had fallen to 198 as compared to 247 from the previous year as well as 67 deaths. 
 The 23 crew members of the MV Cheung Son were murdered by pirates. Eventually captured by Chinese authorities, the 13 suspects were later executed. 
 April – After seizing the Malaysian vessel Petro-Ranger, the pirates forced Captain Ken Blyth to sail to China where the ship was eventually stopped and impounded by authorities. While Blyth was arrested for ordering his crew to surrender to the pirates and imprisoned for 30 days, the pirates faced no charges after being returned to Indonesia.  
 September – The Japanese cargo ship Tenyu disappeared with a cargo of aluminium whilst en route from Indonesia to Korea. It was found three months later by Chinese authorities while docked at Zhangjiagang, its 15 crew members replaced by 16 Indonesians.
 September – The United Kingdom abolished the death penalty for piracy.

1999
April - The Cypriot-registered fuel tanker Valiant Carrier is hijacked in the Malacca Strait when pirates stormed the ship after throwing Molotov cocktails onto the deck. During the attack three of ship's officers are stabbed, as well a seven-month-old girl, before leaving the ship adrift. The crew is able to regain control of the ship, avoiding collision with a nearby island and preventing a massive oil spill. 
April 28 - Holding a ships officer hostage, a ship is robbed of $9,926 and the master's gold bangle after being boarded in Bangka Strait, Indonesia. 
June 8 - A ship bound for Songkhla, Thailand is boarded by pirates in two speedboats off the east coast of Malaysia and hijacked. While holding one crew member hostage, the remaining sixteen crewmen were forced into a lifeboat and set adrift, sailing away with 2,060 tons of gas oil before Chinese  authorities eventually detained the ship. 
October 22 - The Japanese cargo ship Alondra Rainbow is attacked and boarded by ten pirates, eventually setting 17 crew members adrift on one of the ship's life rafts. Without food or water, the sailors drift on the open sea for more than a week before being rescued. The ship, which had since changed its name and was sailing under the flag of Belize, is later sighted by the Indian navy which captures the ship after a two-day chase. It is later discovered, partly from the confessions of the captured pirates while in custody, that they had been planning to exchange the ship's cargo of aluminum ingots for weapons to arm separatist guerillas fighting in Sri Lanka.

2000
Treasure hunter Barry Clifford finds an early 18th-century wreck in the harbor of Île Sainte-Marie, Madagascar.  Archaeologist John De Bry identifies the remains as those of the Fiery Dragon, Christopher Condent's pirate sloop.
February - Contact is lost with the cargo ship MV Hualien off the coast of Taiwan. Neither the ship nor its 21 crew members are found.
February 23 - The Japanese tanker MT Global Mars, carrying 6,000 metric tons of palm oil, is attacked off the coast of Malaysia by pirates armed with automatic weapons. The ships 17 crew members are held captured for 13 days and set adrift in a small boat before being rescued off the coast of Thailand on March 10. As of 2001, the ship remains missing.

See also
 Piracy in the 21st century, for subsequent events
 Timeline of piracy

Piracy by year